Hemmingford or Hemingford can refer to the following:

 Hemingford Abbots: a village formerly in Huntingdonshire - now Cambridgeshire, England
 Hemingford Grey: a village in Cambridgeshire, England
 Hemingford, Nebraska, USA
 Hemmingford, Quebec (township), Canada
 Hemmingford, Quebec (village), Canada